Kanchipura may refer to

Kanchipuram, Tamil Nadu
Kanchipur, Manipur